George Willis (9 November 1926 – 25 May 2011) was an English footballer who played as an inside forward for Brighton & Hove Albion, Plymouth Argyle, Exeter City, and Taunton Town. He won the Third Division South title with Plymouth in 1951–52.

Career
Willis joined Wolverhampton Wanderers in January 1945, having worked as a miner on leaving school. He guested for Port Vale and Crewe Alexandra in 1946. In February 1948, he moved on to Brighton & Hove Albion, who struggled at the foot of the Third Division South table in the 1947–48 campaign, before rising to sixth place in 1948–49. He scored 13 goals in 28 league games for Don Welsh's "Seagulls", before leaving the Goldstone Ground for Plymouth Argyle in May 1949. Jimmy Rae's "Pilgrims" suffered relegation out of the Second Division in 1949–50. Argyle finished fourth in the Third Division South in 1950–51, before winning promotion as the division's champions in 1951–52. The Home Park club then came to within two places of promotion to the First Division in 1952–53, before dropping down to within two places of relegation in 1953–54. Plymouth finished just one place and three points above the drop zone in 1954–55, before suffering relegation in 1955–56 under the stewardship of Jack Rowley. Willis scored 14 goals in 59 league appearances for the club. He joined Norman Dodgin's Exeter City after he and John Porteous were signed for a fee of £250 in March 1956. He spent the 1956–57 season at St James Park, before a spell in the Western League with Taunton Town. He also had a spell with Falmouth Town in the South Western League in the 1958–59 season, and was a South Western League Cup winner in his only season with the club.

Personal and later life
Willis had two children with June, his wife, called Roy and Lynda, and two children from a previous marriage. He ran the Ram and Ewe Bars at the University of Exeter for many years. He was a grandfather to Kate and Emily. Willis died on 25 May 2011, aged 84.

Career statistics
Source:

References

People from Stanley, County Durham
Footballers from County Durham
English footballers
Association football inside forwards
Wolverhampton Wanderers F.C. players
Port Vale F.C. wartime guest players
Crewe Alexandra F.C. wartime guest players
Brighton & Hove Albion F.C. players
Plymouth Argyle F.C. players
Exeter City F.C. players
Taunton Town F.C. players
Falmouth Town A.F.C. players
English Football League players
Western Football League players
1926 births
2011 deaths